Andrzej Witan (born 22 February 1990) is a Polish professional footballer who plays as a goalkeeper for Olimpia Elbląg.

Club career
On 18 May 2019, he scored a winning goal for Bytovia Bytów in 7th added minute of the last game of the season against GKS Katowice. However, Wigry Suwałki, who were fighting  Bytovia and GKS for the one remaining non-relegation spot, also scored a winning goal in added time in their game, and Bytovia was relegated to the third-tier II liga anyway, as was GKS Katowice, and Wigry stayed in the league.
 
On 11 August 2020 he joined Arka Gdynia on a two-year contract.

Honours

Club
Zawisza Bydgoszcz
Polish Cup: 2013-14

References

External links
 
 

1990 births
People from Węgrów County
Sportspeople from Masovian Voivodeship
Living people
Polish footballers
Association football goalkeepers
Zawisza Bydgoszcz players
MKP Pogoń Siedlce players
Bruk-Bet Termalica Nieciecza players
Wisła Puławy players
Bytovia Bytów players
Chojniczanka Chojnice players
Arka Gdynia players
Olimpia Elbląg players
Ekstraklasa players
I liga players
II liga players